The Ladakh football team is an Indian football team representing Ladakh in Indian state football competitions including the Santosh Trophy. It is governed by the Ladakh Football Association, affiliated to the AIFF. The team made its senior national debut in the 2022–23 Santosh Trophy edition.

Squad
The following 22 players were called up for the 2022–23 Santosh Trophy.

References

Santosh Trophy teams
Football in Ladakh